The Ashley Treatment refers to a controversial set of medical procedures performed on an American child, "Ashley X". Ashley, born in 1997, who has severe developmental disabilities due to static encephalopathy; she is assumed to be at an infant level mentally, but continues to grow physically. The treatment included growth attenuation via high-dose estrogens, hysterectomy, bilateral breast bud removal, and appendectomy. In June 2016, after 18 years of searching, Ashley's condition was determined to be the result of a de novo (not inherited, i.e. a mutation) and non-mosaic single-nucleotide polymorphism in the GRIN1 gene, which is implicated in neurotransmission.

The principal purpose of the treatment was to improve Ashley's quality of life by limiting her growth in size, eliminating menstrual cramps and bleeding, and preventing discomfort from large breasts. The combination of the surgery and the estrogen therapy attracted much public comment and ethical analysis in early 2007, both supportive and condemning.

Ashley's parents granted their first written interview to CNN Health in March 2008,
and their second to The Guardian in March 2012.
In addition, The Guardian published two interviews with mothers of a girl
and a boy
who had completed the treatment. A 2014 TV program and article tell the similar story of a girl in New Zealand.
A survey on growth attenuation among pediatric endocrinologists was published in July 2015.

Background 
Ashley was born with a severe brain impairment of genetic cause, termed a "static encephalopathy" because it does not improve. Although she sleeps and awakens, and breathes on her own, she is unable to raise her head, sit up, hold an object, walk, or talk, and must be tube-fed. Nonetheless, she is alert and responsive to her environment, particularly enjoying the music of Andrea Bocelli. Her parents have nicknamed Ashley "Pillow Angel", because she always remains where she is placed, which is usually on a pillow.

In 2004 when Ashley was six and a half years old, she began to show signs of puberty and her parents and doctors began to anticipate a variety of issues common in children with severe neurological impairments. As these children grow larger, it takes more strength to move them and provide basic bodily care, raising the risk of pressure sores from immobility. Precocious puberty is common in children with various forms of severe brain damage. The early appearance of secondary sexual characteristics is often distressing to parents and caretakers. Many parents of severely disabled children explore possible ways to avoid having to deal with menstruation and fertility in a diapered child. A variety of treatments have been used over the last several decades to deal with these issues.

In July 2004, Ashley had a hysterectomy (to prevent menstruation) and surgical removal of her nascent breast buds (to prevent development). She also underwent an appendectomy (because Ashley wouldn't be able to vocalize symptoms). The surgery was performed at Seattle's Children's Hospital and Regional Medical Center. In addition, in December 2006 she completed estrogen therapy through dermal patches, which sped up the natural closure of her growth plates.

Ashley's story first broke in October 2006, in the Archives of Pediatrics & Adolescent Medicine. In January 2007, her parents, who wish to remain anonymous, set up a blog to explain their reasoning for their decision and to share their story with families of other children who might benefit.

Arguments for the treatment 
The parents state that they sought such treatment for the best interests of their daughter, namely, to enable them to personally continue constant care for her at home; to maximize her inclusion in family activities; to avoid the cramps and discomfort associated with menstruation; and to avoid the discomfort from large breasts (which runs in Ashley's family) while lying down or strapped in the chest area while in her wheelchair. Furthermore, they cited additional side benefits: to reduce the risk of bedsores; to prevent breast cancer and fibrocystic growth (both of which have occurred in her family); to prevent pregnancy; and to prevent appendicitis, which occurs in 5% of the population and which would be difficult to diagnose in Ashley as she would be unable to communicate the symptoms. They also believe that without secondary sexual characteristics, Ashley will be less vulnerable to sexual abuse by future caregivers when her parents will no longer be able to care for her.

In an article published in June 2009 on Growth Attenuation, two pediatric endocrinologist and two bioethicists concluded as follows:

The two bioethicists from the previous article also published an article in January 2010 cataloging and countering the criticisms that targeted the Ashley Treatment, and concluded as follows:

Results 

After a year, Ashley's parents considered her treatment a success: She will never experience menstrual discomfort and cramps, she will always be flat chested and avoid breast related discomfort and other issues, and with her growth plates closed, she has reached her adult height of 53 inches (135 cm, or 4 ft 5 in) and weight of 63 pounds (29 kg), an estimated reduction of her potential height and weight of 20% and 40%, respectively.

Reactions 
In the United States, Arthur Caplan, of the University of Pennsylvania's Center for Bioethics, has criticized the Ashley Treatment in an MSNBC editorial, arguing that it is "a pharmacological solution for a social failure—the fact that American society does not do what it should to help severely disabled children and their families."
Three renowned bioethicists spoke in support of the treatment and discussed different aspects of it in opinion statements presented by Scientific American.

Disability rights advocates, including Not Dead Yet and Feminist Response in Disability Activism (FRIDA), called the treatment "invasive medical experimentation", "mutilation", "desexualization", and a violation of Ashley's human rights. FRIDA called on the American Medical Association to condemn the Ashley Treatment.  The Disability Rights Education and Defense Fund (DREDF) declared, "we hold as non-negotiable the principle that personal and physical autonomy of all people with disabilities be regarded as sacrosanct".

Ashley's parents reported that 95% of the 5,000 emails they received were in support of the treatment, many of these testimonies and support emails are posted on Ashley's blog. The parents indicated that there was especially strong support among parents and caregivers of children with similar conditions to Ashley's, those who have the direct experience. They cite several ethicists in support of the treatment, including
George Dvorsky,
Peter Singer,
Norm Fost, and
Doug Diekema.

In the United Kingdom, the British Medical Association stated, "If a similar case occurred in the UK, we believe it would go to court and whatever decision was ruled would be in the best interests of the child." Dr. Peter Hindmarsh, Professor of Paediatric Endocrinology at Great Ormond Street Hospital was troubled by the treatment decision being taken by a hospital ethics committee. I am not sure the ethics committee was the right place to decide,' he said, adding that it was not clear who represented the child's interests when it went before the committee."

In Canada, ethicist Arthur Schafer's nationwide opinion piece defending the operation as justifiable considering Ashley's comfort engendered criticism from disability rights activists such as Dave Hingsburger of the York Central Hospital and Keenan Wellar from the LiveWorkPlay self-advocacy organization. In a rebuttal, Wellar attacked the notion that Ashley's limited mental abilities justified the decisions made on her behalf: "Infants have human rights even though they can't speak for themselves. Why should Ashley have received any less consideration?"

On May 8, 2007, an investigative report done by Disability Rights Washington (formerly The Washington Protection and Advocacy System) in conjunction with The Utah Disability Law Center criticized the hospital that performed this controversial procedure for violating Washington State law, which is disputed by the family's attorney.

References

External links 

 The original medical paper by Drs Gunther and Diekema from Arch Ped Adolesc Med that described the treatment and led to the media publicity.

Medical controversies in the United States
Disability rights
Neurology procedures
Endocrine procedures